Podomí is a municipality and village in Vyškov District in the South Moravian Region of the Czech Republic. It has about 400 inhabitants.

History
The first written mention of Podomí is from 1349, when it was part of the Holštejn estate.

Notable people
Ervín Černý (1913–2001), physician and university professor

References

Villages in Vyškov District